Autalia is a genus of beetles belonging to the family Staphylinidae.

The genus was first described by Leach in 1819.

The species of this genus are found in Europe and Northern America.

Species:
 Autalia impressa
 Autalia longicornis
 Autalia puncticollis
 Autalia rivularis

References

Aleocharinae
Staphylinidae genera